Konstantinos Peletidis (born 1953) is a Greek cardiologist and politician. A member of the communist KKE party, he has served as Mayor of Patras since 1 September 2014. He was born in the village of Ryaki in Northern Greece and studied medicine in Italy. Afterwards, he worked as a cardiologist in Edessa before later settling in Patras with his wife and daughter.

Peletidis is notable for his denial of municipal campaign space to the Neo-Nazi party Golden Dawn. In 2015, then-MP candidate Michalis Arvanitis brought charges of dereliction of duty against Peletidis for this, but in 2017 a local misdemeanors court cleared the charges

References

1953 births
Living people
Mayors of Patras
People from Kozani (regional unit)